Tysons Corner Center is a shopping mall in the unincorporated area of Tysons in Fairfax County, Virginia, United States (between McLean and Vienna, Virginia). It opened to the public in 1968, becoming one of the first fully enclosed, climate-controlled shopping malls in the Washington metropolitan area. The mall's three department store anchors are Bloomingdale's, Macy's, and Nordstrom.

Tysons Corner Center is the largest mall in the Baltimore-Washington area, and the 22nd largest in the United States. To distinguish the two, some people refer to Tysons Corner Center as "Tysons I," and Tysons Galleria as "Tysons II."

History

Tysons Corner Center was one of the first super-regional malls in the country, drawing customers from a multi-state area. The mall was built as a follow-on partnership by Isadore Gudelsky and Theodore Lerner's Wheaton Plaza which opened in 1960. On May 31, 1962, the $20 million project was awarded to Lerner-Gudelsky by a 4–2 vote against James Rouse's Rouse Company with a controversial vote by William H Moss, a County supervisor who also worked for Gudelsky's District Title Insurance Company. A lawsuit involving an exchange of a lease for Lansburgh's in exchange for favorable zoning for the location delayed the opening until 1969. Originally, the mall consisted of 1.2 million square feet (110,000 m2) on one level, three department stores (Hecht's, Lansburgh's, and Woodward & Lothrop), and 100 specialty stores, including Jelleff's. Discount chain Woolworth's operated a store where the current day L.L. Bean resided in the mall until the entire chain went under in 1997.

The Mall originally had 5 courts which were the Umbrella Court in front of Lansburgh's, Fashion Court, Fountain Court in front of Hechts, Aviary Court and Clock Court located near the Woodies entrance. The fashion court stage and flight cage in the aviary court were replaced with fountains when the lower level was added, causing these areas to be mistakenly called "fountain courts" while the original fountains were removed from the Hecht's entrance. Some of the few remaining pieces of the original infrastructure of the 1968 mall are the escalators that serve the second and third floor of Bloomingdale's, which are the original Lansburgh's escalators, and the original passenger and freight elevators from Woodies/JCPenney. Both are still in operation, however they are located in the back hallways and used as service elevators.

Soon after Tysons Corner Center was constructed, the land surrounding the area — previously consisting of farms and rural residences — became prime real estate, prompting the construction of hotels, office buildings, and apartment complexes.  Major retailers near Tysons Corner Center include Crate & Barrel, Tiffany & Co., Hermes Paris, Louis Vuitton, and Gucci, some of which are located in Fairfax Square.

From its opening until the 1990s, the mall contained a wide and diverse retail mix. Hot Shoppes cafeteria also occupied space in the mall until 1998. These types of stores shared space with higher-end tenants such as Liz Claiborne and A/X Armani Exchange. In the 2000s, under the ownership of Wilmorite Properties, the mall re-tenanted and has served as the primary launchpad location for a number of successful retail chains. LL Bean opened its first full line department store outside of its Freeport, Maine headquarters in 2000. Apple opened the first of its retail stores at Tysons in 2001. Martin + Osa and Cusp by Neiman Marcus opened in 2006. MNG By Mango made their U.S. debut at Tysons in 2006 as well, but that store has since closed. In 2007, Canadian-based clothing retailer Garage opened its first U.S. store at Tysons. Many retailers have flagship stores at the mall, including Pottery Barn and Victoria's Secret.

In 1995, Woodies closed and became a JCPenney. This JCPenney location would close only 10 years later in 2005, with the building subsequently converted into two additional levels of mall space anchored by a 16-screen AMC multiplex movie theater, Barnes & Noble Booksellers, and Old Navy. A food court and AMC occupies the third floor.

In 1988, the mall was expanded to add a second floor, at which time Lord & Taylor and Nordstrom opened; this was the first Nordstrom east of the Mississippi River. Today, the mall has 2.1 million square feet (195,000 m2) of retail space on three levels, 16 movie screens, and nearly 300 stores. As part of the upcoming "Tysons Future" renovation and expansion plans, a glass elevator has been added to the Fashion Court (where the Nordstrom wing meets the main mall hallway), which opened on November 28, 2008.

In 2004 The Macerich Company acquired Wilmorite Properties adding another premier super-regional mall in Tysons Corner Center to its portfolio.  Tyson's Corner Center was a particularly significant expansion as the plans were well under way for a massive mixed-use development creating a more urban environment.

In 2013, Tysons Corner Center was assessed for $1 billion, making it by far the most valuable property in the metropolitan area.

In September 2019, it was announced that the Lord & Taylor location at the mall would be closing. L.L. Bean announced the closure of its Tysons Corner Center location, which had an area of roughly 76,000 square feet, in late 2021. Macerich divided the space into smaller stores for multiple tenants following L.L. Bean's exit.

On June 18, 2022, shots were fired in the mall after a fight broke out. Police reported that three people were injured while fleeing the mall, but no one was injured by the gunfire.

Notable openings

First Nordstrom outside of the West Coast (1988)
First L.L. Bean outside of original Freeport, Maine store (2000)
First Apple Store in the world (2001)
First Microsoft Store in the Northeast (2011)
First Spanx store in the world (2012)

Plans

The Washington Metro subway (Silver Line) has expanded westward to Tysons Corner, and has since been extended to Dulles Airport and beyond. The Tysons Corner station on the Silver Line is on the north side of the shopping center where Tysons Boulevard crosses State Route 123 (Chain Bridge Road). There are four stations in the Tysons Corner area. Utility relocation for the project began in 2008. The Silver Line opened July 26, 2014.

The Macerich Company, who acquired owner Wilmorite Properties in 2005, is developing Tysons Corner Center into a community location.  There will be expansions for residential and commercial buildings, along with a hotel.  There will also be slight expansions to the mall.  The project will be completed in four stages and it is expected to be finished in 10 to 15 years, adding  of office, residential, and retail space.

Anchors and major stores
AMC Theatres
Aldo
Bloomingdale's
H&M
Macy's
Nordstrom
Barnes & Noble Booksellers
Old Navy

See also
 Tysons Galleria — a shopping mall located directly north of Tysons Corner Center
 Fairfax Square — a mixed-use development located directly south of Tysons Corner Center
 List of the world's largest shopping malls
 List of largest shopping malls in the United States

References

External links 

 Official site
 Tysons Corner expansion site

Shopping malls in Virginia
Shopping malls established in 1968
Macerich
Economy of Fairfax County, Virginia
1968 establishments in Virginia
Shopping malls in the Washington metropolitan area
Buildings and structures in Fairfax County, Virginia
Tourist attractions in Fairfax County, Virginia
Tysons, Virginia